Moussa Diarra (born 20 January 2002) is a Malian footballer who plays as a central defender for Spanish club Málaga CF.

Club career
Born in Bamako, Diarra moved to Málaga CF's youth categories in 2020, from local side Derby Académie. On 23 July 2021, he signed a new three-year contract with the club.

Diarra made his senior debut with the reserves on 12 September 2021, starting in a 2–1 Tercera División RFEF away loss against Motril CF. He scored his first goal on 24 October, netting the B's third in a 4–2 home win over CD Intergym Melilla.

Diarra made his first team debut on 14 December 2021, starting in a 1–0 loss at CF Rayo Majadahonda, for the season's Copa del Rey. He made his professional debut the following 24 September, playing the full 90 minutes in a 1–1 Segunda División home draw against Villarreal CF B.

References

External links
Málaga profile

2002 births
Living people
Sportspeople from Bamako
Malian footballers
Association football defenders
Segunda División players
Tercera Federación players
Atlético Malagueño players
Málaga CF players
Malian expatriate footballers
Malian expatriate sportspeople in Spain
Expatriate footballers in Spain